The Kawkawlin River is a  stream in the U.S. state of Michigan that flows into Saginaw Bay of Lake Huron at , approximately  west of the mouth of the Saginaw River.

The Kawkawlin has two main branches, the North Branch, which is the longer branch, and the South Branch, which is also known as simply the Kawkawlin River.

The Kawkawlin River system drains all or portions of the following townships:
 In Bay County
 Bangor Township
 Beaver Township
 Garfield Township
 Kawkawlin Township
 Monitor Township
 Mount Forest
 Williams Township
 In Gladwin County
 Bentley Township
 Grim Township (via Chubb Drain)
 In Midland County
 Larkin Township (via Waldo Drain and the Dietline Drain system)
 Midland Township (via Dingman and Waldo drains)
 Mills Township (via Kawkawlin Creek)
In Saginaw County
 Tittabawassee Township (via Culver Creek)

Tributaries 
 (right) Indian Town Drain
 (left) Millpond Drain
 (right) North Branch Kawkawlin River
 (left) Popp Drain
 (left) Hembling Drain
 (right) McNally Drain
 (right) Reinhardt Drain
 (left) Everson Drain
 (left) Garvey Drain
 (right) Kerr Drain
 (left) Lapan Drain
 (left) Bedell Drain
 (left) Hearit Drain
 (right) McDonald Drain
 (right) Kawalski Drain
 (right) Crump Drain
 (right) Renner Drain
 (left) Sequin Drain
 (left) Bleshenski Drain
 (left) Torey Drain
 (left) Gunn Drain
 (left) Kawkawlin Creek
 (right) Herner Drain
 (right) Wright Drain
 Kawkawlin Creek Flooding
 (left) Hoffman Drain
 (right) Watson Drain
 (left) Chubb Drain
 (right) Gear Drain
 (right) Hildebrandt Drain
 (left) Anderson Drain
 (left) Culver Creek
 (left) Wolverine Drain
 (left) Bradford Creek
 (left) Pine Drain
 (left) Phillips Drain
 (left) Hoppler Creek
 (left) Dell Creek
 (left) Perry Creek
 (left) Dingman Drain
 (left) Mason Drain
 (left) DeShano Drain
 (right) Betzold Drain
 (right) Campbell Drain
 (left) Dietline Drain
 (left) Cassube Drain
 (left) Waldo Drain
 (right) Davis Drain
 (left) Shinbines Drain
 (right) Prasty Drain
 (left) Livingstone Drain
 (left) Wenglikowski Drain
 (left) Vogtman Drain
 (left) Panzer Drain
 (right) Kaiser Drain
 (left) Kraweck Drain
 (left) Pashok Drain

References 

Rivers of Michigan
Rivers of Bay County, Michigan
Rivers of Gladwin County, Michigan
Rivers of Midland County, Michigan
Tributaries of Lake Huron
Saginaw Bay